Barh El Gazel Nord is one of two departments of Chad in Barh El Gazel, a region of Chad. Its capital is Salal.

Departments of Chad
Bahr el Gazel Region